John Wilson (1828 – 29 December 1905) was a Liberal Party politician in Scotland.  He was elected as member of parliament (MP) for Glasgow Govan at a by-election in 1889, and held the seat until the 1900 general election.

References

External links 
 

1828 births
1905 deaths
Members of the Parliament of the United Kingdom for Scottish constituencies
UK MPs 1886–1892
UK MPs 1892–1895
UK MPs 1895–1900
Scottish Liberal Party MPs